Opón (Opone) was an unusually divergent Cariban language of Colombia.

Phonology 
Marshall Durbin and Haydée Seijas derive the following phonology based on 1958 data from Giraldo and Fornaguera.

* [ʔ] may not be phonemic, it appears only at morpheme boundaries.

While common in other Cariban languages, nasal vowels are not recorded in Opón.

References 

Indigenous languages of the South American Northwest
Cariban languages
Languages of Colombia